The Swedish Miners' Union (Gruv) was a trade union representing workers in the mining industry in Sweden.

The union was founded at a meeting in Grängesberg on 12 October 1895.  It initially had 600 members, but grew steadily.  It affiliated to the Swedish Trade Union Confederation in 1900, and had 4,504 members by 1908.  Membership declined rapidly following that year's general strike, but was gradually rebuilt, and reached an all-time peak of 13,337 in 1958.  In the winter of 1969/1970, there was a major unofficial strike in the industry, which prompted a brief rebound in membership, but the overall trend was downwards, along with employment in the industry.  By 1993, it had only 5,600 members remaining, and the following year, it merged into the Swedish Metalworkers' Union.

Presidents
1895: Karl-Erik Berg

Edward Mattsson
Vilhelm Isaksson
1960s: Nils Lindell
1970: John Näslund
1979: Anders Stendalen

References

Swedish Trade Union Confederation
Mining trade unions
Trade unions in Sweden
Trade unions established in 1895
Trade unions disestablished in 1994